Yun Byeong-Hui (born February 15, 1976) is a retired South Korean rhythmic gymnast.

She competed for South Korea in the rhythmic gymnastics all-around competition at the 1992 Olympic Games in Barcelona. She was 34th in the qualification and didn't qualify for the final.

References

External links 
 Yun Byeong-Hui at Sports-Reference.com

1976 births
Living people
South Korean rhythmic gymnasts
Gymnasts at the 1992 Summer Olympics
Olympic gymnasts of South Korea
20th-century South Korean women